Cane Hill Hospital was a psychiatric hospital in Coulsdon in the London Borough of Croydon. The site is owned by GLA Land and Property.

History

The hospital has its origins as the third Surrey County Pauper Lunatic Asylum, designed by Charles Henry Howell and built in two stages between 1882 and 1888. The design which involved a 'radiating pavilion' layout was original. The hospital was taken over by London County Council in 1889.

The hospital took in a large number of discharged mentally ill servicemen during the First World War, the earliest patient recorded being admitted in 1915 but later discharged to another hospital in 1923. Records for nearly 40 such service patients – some of whom died and were interred in the hospital cemetery – have been found. It was renamed the Cane Hill Mental Hospital in 1930.

By the late 1980s the number of patients had greatly declined, largely due to the recommendations of the Mental Health Act (1983) with its emphasis on care in the community. Following a gradual winding down of hospital services and operations, the entire hospital with the exception of a small secure unit had closed in March 1991. The secure unit moved into what had been the Coulsdon Cottage Hospital: in 2006 it held 23 patients and was run by the South London and Maudsley NHS Foundation Trust (SLaM). The unit closed in February 2008, with the patients and staff being transferred to the River House, a new Medium Secure Unit at Bethlem Royal Hospital.

Demolition of Cane Hill started in March 2008 and was completed by the end of 2010. Only the chapel, administration building and water tower remained.

On 13 November 2010 a fire took hold in the administration block and went on to destroy all but the front facade of the building. The fire also destroyed the iconic clock tower. At about midnight, firefighters saw the clocktower crash to the ground in the blaze. The fire had been started in the basement of the building, draughting its way up through the ground and first floors before finally destroying the roof.

Hospital cemetery
The hospital had a cemetery on Portnalls Road for inmates which was last used for burials in September 1950 and was deconsecrated and cleared at the hospital site's redevelopment in 1981 when remains of nearly 6,000 people were exhumed and cremated at Croydon Cemetery in Mitcham Road. Among the remains were those of British First World War servicemen, who were known to have had separate areas in the cemetery where they had been originally buried with military honours. Research from plans indicated there were two designated main 'Service Plots', numbered 411 and 420, where six were buried in each grave. Eighteen of these, who had qualified for commemoration by the Commonwealth War Graves Commission (CWGC), are commemorated on a memorial the CWGC erected in Croydon Cemetery, where their ashes had been scattered at 'Location 1000' in the grounds, in 2015.

Legacy
A drawing of Cane Hill Hospital is featured on the front cover of the US release of David Bowie's 1970 album The Man Who Sold the World, apparently because his half brother, Terry, had been a patient there. Metal band Cane Hill based their name on the Cane Hill Hospital.

Notes and references

Further reading

External links

Photographic tour Photographic tour of the hospital and grounds.
The Cane Hill Project exploring and documenting Cane Hill
Cane Hill Demolition A set of photos detailing the demolition of Cane Hill
Cane Hill Hospital Photographs, staff memories, and historical information about Cane Hill

Hospital buildings completed in 1882
Hospital buildings completed in 1888
Buildings and structures in the London Borough of Croydon
Defunct hospitals in London
Former psychiatric hospitals in England
1882 establishments in England
2008 disestablishments in England
Health in the London Borough of Croydon
Hospitals established in 1882
Demolished buildings and structures in England